Life in a Beautiful Light is the third album by Scottish singer-songwriter Amy Macdonald, released on 11 June 2012. The lead single is "Slow It Down" and was released on 20 April 2012. Macdonald's official website confirmed the album for release on 13 April 2012. The track listing was confirmed on Universal Music's store on the same day.

Background
Macdonald began to write Life in a Beautiful Light after having a "lovely year off" following touring in support of A Curious Thing. Macdonald had no time to write songs on her second album as she was touring with This Is the Life. However, Macdonald said she felt that the creation of Life in a Beautiful Light was a more natural process. Two songs from Life in a Beautiful Light were begun before Macdonald's break. "In the End" was written with Macdonald questioning herself whether being a musician was a worthwhile occupation.

Macdonald wrote "Human Spirit" inspired by the Chilean miners' rescue. The song "Left That Body Long Ago" described her grandmother's decline into Alzheimer's disease whilst "Across the Nile" is a response to the conflict of the Arab Spring.

Reception

Critical reception

The album up to now has gathered mixed reviews, earning a collective score of 5.1 out of 10 at AnyDecentMusic?. The Upcoming described the album as a "strong return from Macdonald, interweaving her distinctive voice with splashing cymbals and burbling electronica, but still intermittently flirting with folky affectations". The album received 60/100 on Metacritic, a review aggregator website, signifying "mixed or average reviews".

Chart performance
On 14 June 2012 Life in a Beautiful Light entered the Irish Albums Chart at number 5, making it her highest charting album in Ireland. On 17 June 2012 the album entered the UK Albums Chart at number 2, making it the second highest charting album that week, only beaten by Gary Barlow's album Sing. Only 1,000 copies separated the top three albums. The album fared better in Scotland, where it debuted at number one.

Singles
 "Slow It Down" was released as the lead single from the album on 20 April 2012. The song was a modest hit in Europe, charting at forty-five in the United Kingdom, fifty-six in Austria, fifty in Switzerland and forty in Germany.
 "Pride" was released as the second single from the album on 13 August 2012.
 "4th of July" was released as the third single from the album on 22 October 2012.

Track listings
All songs written by Amy Macdonald

Standard edition

Deluxe edition

Super deluxe box set
A super deluxe box set was also released that contains:
Standard edition of the album
Bonus CD: A selection of acoustic versions, and singalong instrumentals
DVD-5 acoustic versions live
2 litho artwork numbered prints
Sheet music for "Slow It Down"
"Amy Macdonald guitar pic"

Charts and certifications

Weekly charts

Year-end charts

Certifications

References

External links
Life in a Beautiful Light on the official homepage

Amy Macdonald albums
2012 albums
Mercury Records albums
Vertigo Records albums